Lecithocera pachyntis is a moth in the family Lecithoceridae. It was described by Edward Meyrick in 1894. It is found in Myanmar.

The wingspan is 13–14 mm. The forewings are fuscous with a black dot in the disc at one-third, and another at two-thirds. The hindwings are rather light fuscous.

References

Moths described in 1894
pachyntis